The Taipei Metro Xindian station (formerly transliterated as Hsintien Station until 2003) is the southern terminus of the Songshan–Xindian line located in Xindian District, New Taipei, Taiwan.

Station overview

This one-level, underground station, has an island platform and one exit. It is the southernmost station of the Taipei MRT until Dingpu station was completed.

Public Art
Art for the station is titled "Heaven, Earth, and Man" and features many sculptures around the entrances. Designed by Takashi Tanabe, it was selected through open competition and cost NT$6,700,000.

Station layout

References

Railway stations opened in 1999
1999 establishments in Taiwan
Songshan–Xindian line stations